This is a list of Filipino films released on 2011 ranked according to its domestic grosses.

Independent Films

check also:

MMFF

note: MMFF Films's gross are just partial within December 25, 2011 - January 7, 2012 period only.

References

Philippines
highest-grossing Filipino films in 2011